The 1993 Manchester Open was the fourth edition of the Manchester Open tennis tournament in Manchester, United Kingdom and was played outdoor grass courts. The tournament was part of the ATP World Series and was held from 14 June to 21 June 1993.

Jason Stoltenberg won his 6th career title, his first singles title and his only title of the year by defeating Wally Masur in the final.

Finals

Singles

 Jason Stoltenberg defeated  Wally Masur 6–1, 6–3

Doubles

 Ken Flach /  Rick Leach defeated  Stefan Kruger /  Glenn Michibata 6–4, 6–1

References

External links
 ITF tournament edition details